Mimosiphonops is a genus of caecilians in the family Siphonopidae. The genus is definitely known only from the state of Rio de Janeiro, Brazil. They are sometimes known as the worm patterned caecilians.

Description
There are 83–98 vertebrae and 74–88 primary annuli, with the smallest value in both cases pertaining to Mimosiphonops reinhardti that is known from a single specimen. The eyes are not covered by bone. No scales nor secondary annuli are present. The primary annuli and nuchal collars and grooves are clearly marked with a white border.

Species
There are two recognized species:
 Mimosiphonops reinhardti Wilkinson and Nussbaum, 1992
 Mimosiphonops vermiculatus Taylor, 1968

References

Siphonopidae
 
Amphibian genera
Endemic fauna of Brazil
Taxa named by Edward Harrison Taylor
Taxonomy articles created by Polbot